Cumberland West was a provincial electoral district in Nova Scotia, Canada, that elected one member to the Nova Scotia House of Assembly. It was formed in 1949 when Cumberland County was divided into three new districts, the other two being Cumberland Centre and Cumberland East. It existed until 1993, when it was redistributed to include all of Cumberland Centre and a portion of Cumberland East, at which point it was renamed Cumberland South.

Members of the Legislative Assembly 
Cumberland West elected the following members to the Legislature:

Election results

1949 general election

1953 general election

1956 general election

1960 general election

1963 general election

1967 general election

1970 general election

1974 general election

1978 general election

1981 general election

1984 general election

1988 general election

References

Former provincial electoral districts of Nova Scotia